Chilatherina is a genus of rainbowfishes that is endemic to freshwater in New Guinea.

Species
There are currently 11 recognized species in this genus:
 Chilatherina alleni Price, 1997
 Chilatherina axelrodi G. R. Allen, 1979 (Axelrod's rainbowfish)
 Chilatherina bleheri G. R. Allen, 1985 (Bleher's rainbowfish)
 Chilatherina bulolo (Whitley, 1938) (Bulolo rainbowfish)
 Chilatherina campsi (Whitley, 1957) (Highlands rainbowfish)
 Chilatherina crassispinosa (M. C. W. Weber, 1913) (Silver rainbowfish)
 Chilatherina fasciata (M. C. W. Weber, 1913) (Barred rainbowfish)
 Chilatherina lorentzii (M. C. W. Weber, 1907) (Lorentz's rainbowfish)
 Chilatherina pagwiensis G. R. Allen & Unmack, 2012
 Chilatherina pricei G. R. Allen & Renyaan, 1996 (Price's rainbowfish)
 Chilatherina sentaniensis (M. C. W. Weber, 1907) (Sentani rainbowfish)

References 

 
Melanotaeniinae
Taxonomy articles created by Polbot
Freshwater fish of New Guinea